Events from the year 1629 in France.

Incumbents 
Monarch: Louis XIII

Events
 
 
 
 
 
 

 May 14–May 28 – Huguenot rebellions: After a 15-day siege, Louis XIII captures Privas.
 June 17 – Huguenot rebellions: Alès surrenders after an intense siege. As a result, the leader of the Huguenot Rebellions, the Duke of Rohan, surrenders.
 June 28 – Huguenot rebellions: Louis XIII, King of France, signs in his camp at Lédignan the Peace of Alès, ending the Huguenot rebellions. The Huguenots are allowed religious freedom, but lose their political, territorial and military rights.
 August 21 – Huguenot rebellions: Montauban, one of the last Huguenot strongholds, surrenders without a fight to Richelieu's troops.

Births
 

 
 April 1 – Jean-Henri d'Anglebert, French harpsichordist and composer (d. 1691)

Deaths
 October 2 – Pierre de Bérulle, cardinal and statesman (b. 1575)

See also

References

1620s in France